Zenjiro Yasuda (born August 1, 1946) is a Japanese field hockey coach. At the 2012 Summer Olympics he coached the Japan women's national field hockey team.

References

External links
 

Living people
Field hockey coaches
Japanese Olympic coaches
1946 births
Place of birth missing (living people)
21st-century Japanese people